Pincers on Japan is a 19-minute 1944 Canadian documentary film, made by the National Film Board of Canada (NFB). The film was directed by James Beveridge, who also produced and directed a similar NFB documentary, Look to the North. The film's French version title is Piège à Nippon.

Synopsis 
In 1943, Alaska and the north Pacific have become a theatre of war as Japanese forces threaten. For over a decade, Japan had begun training for warfare in a subarctic region, and had targeted the Aleutian Islands where they had maintained a foothold. Both Canadian and American forces are assembled to protect and defend the region, in what came to be known as the Aleutian Islands Campaign.

In 1942, U.S. Army engineers created the Alaska Highway, carved out of the northern bush to bring American troops and supplies northward. Canada's role is to construct airfields alongside the military highway and train troops to fight in the extreme conditions of the region. Out of Canadian ports on the west coast, ship convoys carrying war materiél supply the various outposts of the northwest, while patrol bombers and lookouts keep a constant vigil.

The Japanese invasion of the Aleutian Islands is countered by both a ground and air attack by Allied forces. With the defeat of the Japanese on American territory, Allied strategy moves from defence to taking the fight to the Japanese empire across the Pacific, striking at the heart of Japan.

Production
Typical of the NFB's documentary short films, Pincers on Japan was created as a morale boosting "polemic" or propaganda film during the Second World War. The film relied heavily on newsreel material including "enemy" footage, and combined multiple sources to create a story. 

The deep baritone voice of stage actor Lorne Greene was featured in the narration of Pincers on Japan. Greene, known for his work on both radio broadcasts as a news announcer at CBC as well as narrating many of the Canada Carries On series. His sonorous recitation led to his nickname, "The Voice of Canada", and to some observers, the "voice-of-God". When reading grim battle statistics or narrating a particularly serious topic such as the war on Japan, he was "The Voice of Doom".

Reception
Pincers on Japan was produced in 35 mm for the theatrical market and was shown over a six-month period as part of the shorts or newsreel segments in approximately 800 theatres across Canada and later, the United States. The NFB had an arrangement with Famous Players theatres to ensure that Canadians from coast-to-coast could see them, with further distribution by Columbia Pictures.

After the six-month theatrical tour ended, individual films were made available on 16 mm to schools, libraries, churches and factories, extending the life of these films for another year or two. They were also made available to film libraries operated by university and provincial authorities.

References

Notes

Citations

Bibliography

 Bennett, Linda Greene. My Father's Voice: The Biography of Lorne Greene. Bloomington, Indiana: iUniverse, Inc., 2004. .
 Ellis, Jack C. and Betsy A. McLane. New History of Documentary Film. London: Continuum International Publishing Group, 2005. .
 Leach, Jim and Jeannette Sloniowski, eds. Candid Eyes: Essays on Canadian Documentaries. Toronto: University of Toronto, 2003. .
 Rist, Peter. Guide to the Cinema(s) of Canada. Westport, Connecticut: Greenwood Publishing Group, 2001. .

External links
 Pincers on Japan at NFB.ca.
 Watch Pincers on Japan at Media Collections Online, Indiana University Libraries

1944 films
Canadian aviation films
Canadian black-and-white films
Canadian short documentary films
Canadian World War II propaganda films
Documentary films about military aviation
English-language Canadian films
National Film Board of Canada documentaries
1944 documentary films
Black-and-white documentary films
Aleutian Islands campaign
Quebec films
National Film Board of Canada short films
Columbia Pictures short films
Films directed by James Beveridge
1940s Canadian films